Mohamed Shariff Thowfeek (born 7 January 1971) is a Sri Lankan politician, former provincial councillor, former deputy minister and Member of Parliament.

Early life and family
Thowfeek was born on 7 January 1971. He is the brother of former MP K. M. Thowfeek.

Career
Thowfeek contested the 2000 parliamentary election as one of the People's Alliance (PA) electoral alliance's candidates in Trincomalee District and was elected to the Parliament. The alliance between the Sri Lanka Muslim Congress (SLMC) and PA crumbled in June 2001 and in October 2001 the SLMC joined the opposition United National Front (UNF).

Thowfeek contested the 2001 parliamentary election as one of the UNF's candidates in Trincomalee District but failed to get re-elected. However, after the election he was appointed to the Parliament as a National List MP representing the UNF. He contested the 2004 parliamentary election as a SLMC candidate in Trincomalee District but failed to get re-elected after coming 3rd amongst the SLMC candidates.

Thowfeek contested the 2008 provincial council election as one of the UNF's candidates in Trincomalee District and was elected to the Eastern Provincial Council. He contested the 2010 parliamentary election as one of the UNF's candidates in Trincomalee District and was re-elected. Following the 2015 presidential election and the change in government Thowfeek was appointed Deputy Minister of Internal Transport in January 2015.

Thowfeek contested the 2015 parliamentary election as one of the United National Front for Good Governance (UNFGG) electoral alliance's candidates in Trincomalee District but failed to get re-elected. However, following the resignation of A. R. A. Hafeez in January 2016 he was appointed to the Parliament as a National List MP representing the UNFGG. He contested the 2020 parliamentary election as a Samagi Jana Balawegaya electoral alliance candidate in Trincomalee District and was re-elected.

Electoral history

References

1971 births
Deputy ministers of Sri Lanka
Living people
Members of the 11th Parliament of Sri Lanka
Members of the 12th Parliament of Sri Lanka
Members of the 14th Parliament of Sri Lanka
Members of the 15th Parliament of Sri Lanka
Members of the 16th Parliament of Sri Lanka
Members of the Eastern Provincial Council
People from Eastern Province, Sri Lanka
Samagi Jana Balawegaya politicians
Sri Lanka Muslim Congress politicians
Sri Lankan Moor politicians
Sri Lankan Muslims